The tonsillar branches of glossopharyngeal nerve supply the palatine tonsil, forming around it a plexus from which filaments are distributed to the soft palate and fauces, where they communicate with the palatine nerves.

References

Glossopharyngeal nerve